The third season of the American comedy-drama television series Orange Is the New Black premiered on Netflix on June 11, 2015, at 12:00 am PST in multiple countries. It consists of thirteen episodes, each between 53–60 minutes, with a 90-minute finale. The series is based on Piper Kerman's memoir, Orange Is the New Black: My Year in a Women's Prison (2010), about her experiences at FCI Danbury, a minimum-security federal prison. The series is created and adapted for television by Jenji Kohan. 

The season received critical acclaim, again winning the Screen Actors Guild Award for Outstanding Performance by an Ensemble in a Comedy Series and Outstanding Performance by a Female Actor in a Comedy Series for Uzo Aduba, and numerous other awards.

Episodes

Cast and characters

Main cast

Recurring cast

Inmates

Production
On May 5, 2014, the series was renewed for a third season. For the third season, several actors were promoted to series regulars, including Selenis Leyva, Adrienne C. Moore, Dascha Polanco, Nick Sandow, Yael Stone, and Samira Wiley. Both Jason Biggs and Pablo Schreiber were confirmed as not returning for the third season, but Schreiber appeared in the 10th episode of the third season.

Reception

Critical reception
The third season received critical acclaim. On Metacritic, it has a score of 83 out of 100 based on 24 reviews. On Rotten Tomatoes, it has a 96% rating with an average score of 8.2 out of 10 based on 53 reviews. The site's critical consensus reads: "Thanks to its blend of potent comedy and rich character work, Orange is the New Black remains a bittersweet pleasure in its third season."

Accolades
For its third season, Orange Is the New Black won Screen Actors Guild Awards for Outstanding Performance by an Ensemble in a Comedy Series and Outstanding Performance by a Female Actor in a Comedy Series (Aduba). It received a Golden Globe Award nomination for Best Television Series – Musical or Comedy. The series has also received, among other accolades, six Writers Guild of America Award nominations, five Satellite Awards, four Critics' Choice Television Awards, a GLAAD Media Award, an American Cinema Editors Award, a Producers Guild of America Award, and a Peabody Award.

Broadcast
In Australia, the third season began airing on Showcase on June 11, 2015.

References

External links
 
 

Orange Is the New Black
2015 American television seasons